HD 34790 is a double-lined spectroscopic binary star system in the northern constellation of Auriga. It has a combined apparent magnitude of 5.66, which means it is faintly visible to the naked eye. Based upon observations by the Hipparcos satellite, it is located around 289 light years away. It has a combined stellar classification of A1Vs, matching that of an A-type main sequence star, and shines with 35 times the luminosity of the Sun.

The two stars orbit each other with a period of only 2.15 days and an eccentricity of zero, indicating their orbit is close to circular. They are orbiting sufficiently close to each other that their rotation periods have most likely become tidally locked—meaning they always maintain the same face toward each other.

References

External links
 HR 1752
 Image HD 34790

Auriga (constellation)
034790
Spectroscopic binaries
025001
A-type main-sequence stars
1752
Durchmusterung objects